Troitske is an urban-type settlement in the Svatove Raion of Luhansk Oblast, Ukraine.

Troitske may also refer to:
 Troitske, Sievierodonetsk Raion, a village in Luhansk Oblast, Ukraine
 Troitske, Sloviansk Raion, a village in Donetsk Oblast, Ukraine
 Troitske, Yasynuvata Raion, a village in Donetsk Oblast, Ukraine
 Troitske, a village near Bila Tserkva, in Kyiv oblast, Ukraine